Madge Blake (née Cummings; May 31, 1899 – February 19, 1969) was an American character actress best remembered for her role as Larry Mondello's mother, Margaret Mondello, on the CBS/ABC sitcom Leave It to Beaver, as Flora MacMichael on the ABC/CBS sitcom The Real McCoys, and as Aunt Harriet Cooper in 96 episodes of ABC's Batman. Gene Kelly had a special affection for her and included her in each of his films following her role in An American in Paris.

Early life
Blake was born in Kinsley in Edwards County, south-central Kansas, to Albert Cummings and the former Alice Stone. Her father was a Methodist circuit rider who discouraged her from becoming an actress, thus she did not enter acting until later in life, despite her family's relocation from Kansas to Southern California. 

During World War II, Blake and her husband James Lincoln Blake worked in Utah on construction of the detonator for the atomic bomb and performed such jobs as testing equipment destined for the Manhattan Project. The couple received a citation for their work from the U.S. government.

Blake was a first cousin of actor Milburn Stone (her mother and his father were sister and brother), who played the role of Doc Adams on Gunsmoke Western series. She did not begin to study acting until she was 50 years old, when she enrolled at the Pasadena Playhouse and took advantage of whatever influence or contacts Milburn Stone had to land acting roles. In the middle 1950s, Blake appeared on Rod Cameron's City Detective and in Ray Milland's sitcom Meet Mr. McNutley, renamed in the second season as The Ray Milland Show. Blake appeared in four episodes of the NBC sitcom It's a Great Life (1954–1956) and twice on CBS's December Bride, with Spring Byington.

Acting career
Blake portrayed gushy gossip columnist Dora Bailey in Singin' in the Rain (1952) and was a model for one of the fairies (Fauna) in Walt Disney's animated version of Sleeping Beauty (1959). She appeared as Mrs. Porter, a babysitter, in the 1959 pilot of CBS's Dennis the Menace. About this time, she was cast in a guest-starring role in the sitcoms Guestward, Ho!, with Joanne Dru on ABC, and Angel, with Annie Fargé on CBS. In 1960, she guest-starred in "Tom Cuts Off the Credit," the premiere episode of the sitcom The Tom Ewell Show starring Tom Ewell. In 1961, she guest-starred in the episode "A View of Murder" of the syndicated crime drama The Brothers Brannagan. Blake's Flora MacMichael was a romantic foil to Walter Brennan's Grandpa Amos McCoy on The Real McCoys, a sitcom about a mountain family that relocated to Southern California.

Before her role on Batman, she had a recurring role on The Jack Benny Program as the president of the Jack Benny Fan Club - Pasadena Chapter. She played Millie Brinkerhoff in the episode "Instant Wedding" in the 1963 NBC military drama The Lieutenant starring Gary Lockwood in the title role, and Larry Mondello's mother on Leave It to Beaver. Blake appeared in the pilot episode of The Addams Family (broadcast in the U.S in September 1964) as Miss Comstock, an official from the Addams' children's school. Blake also appeared in a memorable episode of I Love Lucy in 1957 with George Reeves guest-starring as Superman and in an earlier episode in 1954 as store clerk Mrs. Mulford. She played the mother of Joey Barnes on The Joey Bishop Show from 1961 to 1964. At one point, the producers of Batman wanted to fire Blake for unknown reasons. Adam West, with whom she had become friends, stood up for her and she kept her job. The next day, he found a freshly baked cake in his dressing room.

Declining health and death
Declining health caused Blake's role as Aunt Harriet to be reduced, and with the introduction of Batgirl in the third and final season of Batman, she appeared in only two episodes that season in a guest role. Shortly before her death, she appeared as Mrs. Hardy in the episode "The Con Man" of the CBS sitcom The Doris Day Show.

Blake was admitted to Huntington Memorial Hospital where she died at age 69, the result of a heart attack. She was interred beside her mother in the family plot at Grand View Memorial Park Cemetery.

Filmography

Two Sisters from Boston (1946) as Opera Chorus Member (uncredited)
Adam's Rib (1949) as Mrs. Bonner, Adam's Mother (uncredited)
A Life of Her Own (1950) as Regent Studios' Wardrobe Woman (uncredited)
Between Midnight and Dawn (1950) as Mrs. Mallory
M (1951) as Police Station Witness (uncredited)
The Prowler (1951) as Martha Gilvray
No Questions Asked (1951) as Mrs. Brent, Ellen's Landlady (uncredited)
Queen for a Day (1951) as Mrs. Kimpel, High Diver segment
An American in Paris (1951) as Edna Mae Bestram (uncredited)
Rhubarb (1951) as Mrs. Emily Thompson (uncredited)
Little Egypt (1951)
A Millionaire for Christy (1951) as Mrs. Rapello (scenes deleted)
Finders Keepers (1952)
Singin' in the Rain (1952) as Dora Bailey (uncredited)
Skirts Ahoy! (1952) as Mrs. Jane Vance (uncredited)
Washington Story (1952) as Woman Bystander (uncredited)
It Grows on Trees (1952) as Woman (uncredited)
Something for the Birds (1952) as Mrs. J.L. Chadwick
The Iron Mistress (1952) as Mrs. Cuny (uncredited)
The Bad and the Beautiful (1952) as Mrs. Rosser (uncredited)
It Happens Every Thursday (1953) as Clubwoman (uncredited)
The Band Wagon (1953) as Investor (uncredited)
Dangerous Crossing (1953) as Ship's Passenger at Purser's Office (uncredited)
The Long, Long Trailer (1953) as Aunt Anastacia
Rhapsody (1954) as Mrs. Cahill
Fireman Save My Child (1954) as Mrs. Spencer - Fire Commissioner's Wife
Brigadoon (1954) as Mrs. McIntosh (uncredited)
Ricochet Romance (1954) as Dowager (uncredited)
Athena (1954) as Mrs. Smith (uncredited)
Ain't Misbehavin' (1955) as Mrs. Hildegarde Grier (uncredited)
The Private War of Major Benson (1955) as Woman at Airport (uncredited)
It's Always Fair Weather (1955)as Mrs. Stamper (uncredited)
The Tender Trap (1955) as Society Reporter (uncredited)
Glory (1956) as Aunt Martha (uncredited)
Please Murder Me (1956) as Jenny (uncredited)
The Solid Gold Cadillac (1956) as Commentator on TV (uncredited)
You Can't Run Away from It (1956) as Proprietor's Wife (uncredited)
Kelly and Me (1957) as Stout Woman (uncredited)
All Mine to Give (1957) as Woman who opens door (uncredited)
Designing Woman (1957) as Party Guest (uncredited)
Loving You (1957) as Hired Agitator (uncredited)
The Restless Gun (1957) as Emily Davis in Episode "The Gold Buckle"
The Heart Is a Rebel (1958) as Mrs. Carlson
Please Don't Eat the Daisies (1960) as Mrs. Kilkinny (scenes deleted)
Bells Are Ringing (1960) as Woman on Street (uncredited)
Sergeants 3 (1962) as Mrs. Parent (uncredited)
Looking for Love (1964) as Mrs. Press (uncredited)
Joy in the Morning (1965) as Miss Vi (uncredited)
The Trouble with Angels (1966) as Exasperated Lady on Train (uncredited)
The Last of the Secret Agents? (1966) as Middle-Aged Lady at Topless a Go-Go (uncredited)
Batman (1966) as Aunt Harriet Cooper
Follow Me, Boys! (1966) as Cora Anderson (uncredited)

References

External links

 1966 Batman TV Heroes - Madge Blake

1899 births
1969 deaths
American film actresses
Methodists from Kansas
American television actresses
Actresses from Kansas
Actresses from Los Angeles
People from Kinsley, Kansas
20th-century American actresses
Burials at Grand View Memorial Park Cemetery